Soline is a village in Croatia. It is connected by the D8 highway.

References

Populated places in Dubrovnik-Neretva County